Llanbedr is a small village  northeast of Crickhowell in the county of Powys, Wales and the community of Vale of Grwyney. It lies above the river known as the Grwyne Fechan just above its confluence with the Grwyne Fawr in the southern reaches of the Black Mountains range. The village lies within the shadow of Table Mountain, an outlying spur of Pen Cerrig-calch on which is perched the Iron Age hill fort of Crug Hywel.

The church of St Peter is a grade II* listed building.

References

External links
images of Llanbedr and surrounding area on Geograph website

Villages in Powys
Black Mountains, Wales